The Haute Autorité pour la transparence de la vie publique (HATVP) (lit. High Authority for the Transparency of Public Life) is an independent French administrative authority created by the law on transparency of public affairs on October 11th, 2013. It replaced the Commission pour la transparence financière de la vie politique (lit. Commission for the financial transparency of politics). The HATVP is responsible for ascertaining and preventing potential conflicts of interest among French public servants.

History 
Until 1989, the investigation and application of ethical problems, which included conflicts of interest or chronicles, were included in criminal proceedings, but had no special laws or authority to deal with such affairs until the Luchaire Affair that took place between 1982 and 1986. During the tenure of Charles Hernu, France supplied shells to Iran. The newspaper La Presse de la Manche and a report of the Contrôle général des armées published by L'Express in January 1987 revealed that end-user certificates were falsified to show destinations other than Iran, as the country was under an arms embargo at the time.

After this scandal, the first "transparency of public life" law was passed; it defined the state funding of political parties and mandated some public servants to publish their financial status. However, this law was very vague and unclear in some aspects.

In 1994, a parliamentary working group led by Philippe Séguin made 18 proposals including the limitation of election expenses, the reformation of the status of political parties, and the extension of the mandatory declaration of status to more categories of public servants.

On 14 January 2020, the High Authority received three delegates from the European Commission.

On April 10th, 2013, after the Cahuzac affair, the HATVP was created.

Missions
The main missions of the HATVP are:
 To prevent conflicts of interest for key public servants
 To inspect any significant changes to the net assets of public servants during their service (as an anti-fraud measure)
 To inspect faulty or fraudulent declarations of Conflict of Interest or assets of public servants
 To oversee "revolving door" behaviors among former and present public servants
 To oversee lobbying

Composition
The HATVP is composed of:
 A president
 Two members elected by the Conseil d'État
 Two members elected by the Court of Audit
 One member nominated by the president of the National Assembly
 One member nominated by the president of the Senate

References

External links
 

Government of France